Stalking the Night Fantastic is the first edition of the Bureau 13 role-playing game published by Tri-Tac Inc. in 1983.

Publication history
Stalking the Night Fantastic was designed by Richard Tucholka, Chris Beiting, and Robert Sadler, and published by Tri-Tac Inc. in 1983 as a square-bound 104-page book. It was inspired by the campy "creature of the week" horror show Kolchak: the Night Stalker (explaining the game's awkward title). The following year, Tri-tac published a second edition that was ring-bound.

Description
Stalking the Night Fantastic is an eccentric supernatural horror system set in the near future in which the players are agents of the ultra-secret Bureau 13, an organization dedicated to fighting the growing influence of black magic and the supernatural. 

The character creation system uses 17 abilities to define a player character, most determined by rolling four six-sided dice then subtracting 4, resulting in a range of 0-20. Some are determined by rolling 2 dice and subtracting 20, or are calculated from previously generated ability scores. Once abilities have been determined, occupational skills and other skills are determined.

There are also rules for magic and psionics, and two combat systems: a "Recommended Play" version for players, and a "Fast Play" system for NPCs. In addition, there are over twenty different tables covering various ways that characters can die, from asphyxiation to car accidents.

Reception
In the July 1984 edition of Dragon (Issue 87), Jerry Epperson felt the strongest part of Stalking the Night Fantastic was the list of encounters, which "run the entire gauntlet from African Witch Doctors and Aliens to Purple Monsters and Shapeless Disgusting Things." But he had a number of issues with the game. He pointed out that although a character can theoretically have an ability score of zero, none of the ability score tables gave results for scores lower than 1. Epperson also disliked the two separate combat systems for characters and NPCs, which tilted combat results in favour of the NPCs. Epperson also found the rules very disorganized, saying, "an index would be indispensable as a gaming aid." He concluded that "Stalking the Night Fantastic is not terrible game, just a very near miss... The game would suit 'tinkerers' or those GMs who only buy a game to get inspiration for their own systems. Beginners or players who are not enthusiastic about putting in some overtime on reworking the rules would do better to stay away from this one."

Reviews
Different Worlds (Issue 39 - May 1985)
Knights of the Dinner Table Magazine (Issue 174 - Apr 2011)

References

Horror role-playing games
Role-playing games introduced in 1983
Tri Tac Games games